The Other Black Girl is a 2021 novel by Zakiya Dalila Harris. The debut novel follows a woman who is the only Black person working at a publishing company. It was sold at auction to Atria Publishing Group for over $1 million. A television series pilot based on the novel is planned for Hulu.

Plot
Nella Rogers is an editorial assistant and the only Black employee at Wagner Books, a publishing house in New York City. When Hazel-May McCall, another Black woman, is hired as an editorial assistant, Nella initially believes the she will be an ally. While Hazel seems supportive in their personal interactions, Nella soon finds herself sidelined and her relationships at Wagner strained due to Hazel's advice and interference. Nella receives anonymous notes ordering her to leave Wagner. Nella begins to suspect that Hazel is not what she seems, and searches for answers about both Hazel's and Wagner Books's dark pasts.

Background 
Harris cites Passing by Nella Larsen, Octavia E. Butler’s Kindred, Toni Morrison’s Sula, and Americanah by Chimamanda Ngozi Adichie as key influences on the novel. Harris has also cited Jordan Peele's movie Get Out and Ira Levin's The Stepford Wives as inspiration for the novel, which contains elements of horror and satire.

Reception 
The Other Black Girl was released on June 1, 2021 and received positive critical reception from outlets such as the Washington Post and Kirkus Reviews. The Guardian described it as "a glimpse into the publishing world and its original take on black professional women striving to hold on to their authentic selves and their stresses."

A TV adaptation of this book is currently in development with Tara Duncan, Temple Hill Entertainment, and Hulu. Harris is co-writing the pilot with Rashida Jones.

References

2021 American novels
2021 debut novels
American thriller novels
Atria Publishing Group books